is a Japanese actor, singer, and producer. He is best known for his role as Sakutaro Matsumoto in TV drama Socrates in Love and as Densha Otoko in the 2005 film of the same name. Yamada gained international popularity through his portrayal as Tamao Serizawa in Crows Zero film series. Japanese media often dubs him as chameleon actor for his wide acting spectrum throughout his career. He began venturing as producer with live-action web series Saint Young Men. Since 2018 he releases music as the lead singer of band The XXXXXX.

Career
Yamada was born in Naha, Okinawa but raised in Satsumasendai, Kagoshima until the age of 15. He is the youngest of three siblings with two older sisters, Kaori and Sayuki who worked as models for teen magazines in late 1990s. Yamada got scouted after shopping with his sisters in front of Laforet Harajuku. After being scouted, in his third year of middle school he moved from Kagoshima to Tokyo. Yamada graduated from a middle school in Tokyo but did not go to high school to focus on his acting career.

He made his debut in 1999 by starring in TV drama Psychometrer Eiji 2. He also had a significant role in the NHK Asadora: Churasan (ちゅらさん) in 2001.  His breakout was the 2003 TV drama about men synchronized swimming Water Boys, taking the lead role as Kankuro Shindo. He was chosen to portray Shindo through audition among hundreds of young actors. Yamada continued his success in leading role with Socrates in Love as Sakutaro Matsumoto the year after. In the same year, he got Newcomer Award at 2004 Elan d'or Awards and was appointed as first image character of newly reformed Tokyo Metro. As of 2017, Yamada was the only male image character Tokyo Metro has ever had. After his triumphant breakout on television, he got his first movie lead role in Densha Otoko which later became Japan's 14th best selling movie of 2005.

In 2002 he released  a CD with a couple of songs (with the backup versions), as well as a DVD with the musical video for the theme song.
He collaborated with Jin Akanishi in August 2016 to form the unit called "Jintaka", which disbanded 2 months later. And in 2018, together with Gō Ayano (guitar), and Asahi Uchida (synthesizer), forms the unit "The xxxxxx" (read as: "The Six") (Yamada is vocals).

Filmography

Series

Film

Voice work

Documentary

Musicals

Commercials

Discography

Other Musical Collaborations
 Directed music video for "Tee"'s song , and makes a cameo appearance in it (May 31, 2016).
  (Cannes no Kyuujitsu feat. Yamada Takayuki), Fujifabric's single (February 2, 2017)

Awards and nominations

Awards
 2004: 42nd Television Drama Academy Awards – Best Actor for Socrates in Love
 2004: 8th Nikkan Sports Drama Awards – Best Leading Actor ranked 2nd for Socrates in Love
 2004: Japanese Academy Prize – Best Newcomer
 2005: Oricon Best Leading Film Actors – Best Leading Actor ranked 4th for Densha Otoko
 2006: 48th Television Drama Academy Awards – Best Actor for Byakuyakō [Journey Under the Midnight Sun]
 2011: New York Asian Film Festival – Star Asia Rising Star Award

References

External links
 
 
 

Japanese male film actors
Japanese male musical theatre actors
Japanese male rock singers
Japanese male television actors
Japanese male voice actors
1983 births
Actors from Kagoshima Prefecture
Living people
People from Naha
Stardust Promotion artists
Musicians from Kagoshima Prefecture
20th-century Japanese male actors
21st-century Japanese male actors
20th-century Japanese male singers
20th-century Japanese singers
21st-century Japanese male singers
21st-century Japanese singers